Gádoros, known until 1901 as Bánfalva, is a village in Békés County, in the Southern Great Plain region of south-east Hungary.

Geography
It covers an area of 38.13 km² and has a population of 4095 people (2002). 
Photos from the village: http://www.gadoros.hu/album/pages/legifelv_jpg.htm

External links

  in Hungarian

Populated places in Békés County